Thomas John Law (born 17 December 1992) is an English actor. He began his career as a child actor, playing Peter Beale in the BBC One soap opera EastEnders from 2006 to 2010. He was the fifth actor to reprise the role, followed by Ben Hardy in 2013. Since 2021, he has appeared in the ITV drama series The Bay as DC Eddie Martin.

Early life
Law was born in Hatfield, Hertfordshire to Trish  and Robert Law and grew up in Potters Bar with his two older sisters. He also has family in Australia and Dorset. Law attended Chancellor's School in Brookmans Park.

Career
Law began modeling at the age of four. He made his television debut in 2005 with a recurring role in the BBC One soap opera Casualty. He would later return as a guest in 2014.

The following year, Law became the fifth actor to take over the role of Peter Beale in EastEnders, proceeded by James Martin and followed by Ben Hardy. He was in a scene nominated for Spectacular Scene of the Year at the 2008 British Soap Awards. It was announced in November 2010 that Law would be leaving the soap opera after four years; he was preparing to make his stage debut as the titular role in Peter Pan. He played Ste on the 2015 UK tour of Beautiful Thing alongside Sam Jackson and Charlie Brooks.

Law landed small film roles in The World's End in 2013, Unhallowed Ground in 2015, and Gutterdämmerung and the American teen musical  A Cinderella Story: If the Shoe Fits opposite Sofia Carson in 2016.

In 2021, Law joined the cast of the ITV crime drama The Bay for its second series on as DC Eddie Martin. Metro called it his "small screen comeback".

Philanthropy
In 2007 and 2008, Law took part in Children In Need. With the cast of EastEnders, he recorded The Beatles song "A Little Help from My Friends" (2007), Songs From West End Musicals (2008), and Motown Hits (2009).  Other notable charity work has included playing at the Alan Ball Memorial Cup in 2007, the opening of the kitchens at the University Hospitals of Leicester.

In December 2007, Law was invited to Luton & Dunstable Hospital by his aunt, where he spent time with children who had to stay in the wards over Christmas. He chatted, took pictures, and signed autographs. After the event, hospital spokesman Barry Mayes said "[Law] gave a big chunk of his time. He was very pleasant, mature and humble, and really homed in on the children and how they were feeling."

In February 2010, Law attended a fundraising event along with other members of the EastEnders cast to raise money for victims of the 2010 Haiti earthquake. The event took place at the Ricoh Arena in Coventry.

Personal life
In terms of sports, Law is a supporter of Leicester City. He plays golf, football and cricket, in addition to singing and running.

Filmography

Film

Television

Stage

References

External links 

 
 
 

Living people
1992 births
21st-century English male actors
English male child actors
English male soap opera actors
English male models
Male actors from Hertfordshire
People from Hatfield, Hertfordshire
People from Potters Bar